Unfuckwitable or Unfuckwittable may refer to:

Albums and EPs
 Unfuckwitable, a 2017 mixtape by Ann Marie
 Unfuccwitable, a 2019 mixtape by Asian Doll
 Unfuckwitable, a 2021 EP by Babyface Ray

Songs
 "Unfuckwitable", a song by DJ Desue, Curse and Sauce Money from the 2002 album The Art of War
 "Unfuckwitable", a song by Fabolous from his 2011 mixtape There Is No Competition 3: Death Comes in 3's
 "Unfuckwitable", a song by Smoke DZA from his 2016 mixtape George Kush da Button (Don't Pass Trump the Blunt)
 "Unfuckwitable", a song by Psalm One and Optiks from their 2020 EP Before They Stop Us
 "Unfuckwitable", a song by Zayn from his 2021 album Nobody Is Listening
 "Unfuckwittable", a song by Jamal from his 1995 album Last Chance, No Breaks
 "Unfuckwittable", a song by Kid Cudi from his 2013 album Indicud